Diego Duarte or Jacob Duarte (1612–1691) was a 17th-century Portuguese jeweler, banker, composer, organist and art collector living in Antwerp, who owned paintings by Jan Vermeer, Raphael and others.

Duarte was born in Antwerp, the son of Gaspar Duarte I, a Christian diamond and art dealer of Jewish descent in Antwerp, who was befriended with e.g. Constantijn Huygens. Gaspar was the son of Diego Duarte I, and was born in 1584 in Antwerp. He later became the consul of Portugal in Antwerp. In 1635, Diego was appointed "jeweller in ordinary" by Charles I of England, but he returned to Antwerp in 1642.  He received a part of the art collection of his father on his death in 1653, and continued collecting throughout his life. Part of his collection was sold in Amsterdam in 1682.  Diego had a long correspondence and friendship with Constantijn Huygens Jr. The house of the Duarte's in Antwerp was called the Antwerp Parnassus, a meeting place for intellectuals to enjoy art and music. William III of England repeatedly stayed at the house between 1674 and 1678. Diego's brother Gaspar Duarte II was an art collector as well, and his sister Leonora was a composer. After the childless death of Diego Duarte in 1691, no Duartes remained in Antwerp.

Some 200 paintings of Diego's collection were inherited by his nephew Manuel Levy Duarte. Most were sold between 1693 and 1696.

Collection
This incomplete list is based on the inventory of 1682, and uses the attributions given therein for what they're worth.
Jacob Adriaensz Backer, Last Judgment
Jacopo Bassano, 1 piece
Theodoor Boeyermans, 7 pieces
Paris Bordone, 1 piece
Paul Bril, a Pan and 2 other pieces
Adriaen Brouwer, 3 pieces
Jan Brueghel the Elder, 14 pieces
Pieter Bruegel the Elder, a version of The Peasant Wedding, a Peasant Dance, and a Flight To Egypt
Caravaggio, 1 piece
Michiel Coxie, a Maria
Jan Davidsz. de Heem, 3 pieces
Gerrit Dou, 2 pieces
Adam Elsheimer, 3 pieces
Jan Fyt, 3 pieces
Giorgione, 3 pieces
Hans Holbein the Younger, 1 piece
Jan Mabuse, Portrait of a Praying Man and a portrait of Henry VIII of England and his sisters as children
Quentin Matsys, 4 pieces
Antonis Mor, Self Portrait as the Apostle Paul and five other paintings
Palma Vecchio, 2 pieces
Parmigianino, 4 pieces
Jan Porcellis or Julius Porcellis, 3 pieces
Raphael: Holy Family with Anne (this was judged to be the most valuable painting in the 1682 inventory of Duarte's collection), Sacrifice of Elijah and Vision of Ezekiel
Guido Reni, 1 piece
Jusepe de Ribera, 1 piece
Hans Rottenhammer, 4 pieces: one in collaboration with Paul Brill, two with Jan Brueghel the Elder
Peter Paul Rubens, Opportunity (an important but lost work, known from a few copies), The Prodigal Son (now at the Royal Museum of Fine Arts, Antwerp), 4 other pieces, and two oil sketches
Rubens and Jan Brueghel the Elder, Battle of the Amazons, now in Sanssouci
Rubens and Frans Snyders, Silenus
Rubens and Jan Boeckhorst, 2 paintings
Andrea del Sarto, Anna selbdritt, two other paintings, and two sketches
David Teniers the Younger, Peasant Kermis
Tintoretto, 2 pieces
Titian, a Mary Magdalen and four other works
Jan van Dalen, 2 pieces showing a male and female pilgrim
Anthony van Dyck, twelve paintings
Jan van Eyck, a King of the Moors
Lucas van Leyden, a Maria
Frans van Mieris the Elder, The Serenade and 1 other piece
Cornelius van Poelenburgh, 4 pieces
Hendrik van Steenwijk II and other members of his family, 3 pieces
Nicolaes van Verendael, 3 pieces
Jan Vermeer, Lady Standing at a Virginal or Lady Seated at a Virginal (the other was owned at the same time by Jacob Dissius)
Wouwerman (unsure which of the three brothers), 8 pieces

Notes

Further reading
Johannes Gouw, Catalogus der Schilderijen van Diego Duarte, te Amsterdam in 1682, in De Oude Tijd Vol. 2, 1870 
H. G. Dogaer, De inventaris der schilderijen van Diego Duarte, in Jaarboek van het Koninklijk Museum voor Schone Kunsten Antwerpen pages 195-221, 1971
Edgar R. Samuel, The disposal of Diego Duarte's Stock of Paintings, in Jaarboek van het Koninklijk Museum voor Schone Kunsten Antwerpen pages 305-324, 1976
Entry in the Nieuw Nederlandsch Biografisch Woordenboek
Timothy de Paepe, Diego Duarte ii (1612–1691): a converso’s experience in seventeenth-century Antwerp, in Jewish History Volume 24 (2010), Number 2, pages 169-193 

Art collectors from Antwerp
Diamond dealers
1612 births
1691 deaths
Businesspeople from Antwerp
Belgian Sephardi Jews